Roaring Beach is a beach notable for its sand dunes, surfing and beach combing on the Tasman Peninsula, Tasmania, Australia

Surfing
This popular surfing beach is the only one on the west coast of the Tasman Peninsula, which is the prevailing wind direction. It has a dangerous rip.

It is part of Protected areas of Tasmania under conservation areas.  It is accessed by road from Nubeena (the aboriginal word for crayfish).

Aboriginal artefacts
Middens, fossilised wood and stone tools exist near the mouth of the creek.

References

External links
http://beachsafe.org.au/beach/tas0335 (Roaring Beach)
http://www.touringtasmania.info/roaring_beach.htm

Beaches of Tasmania
Surfing locations in Tasmania